Mark Noot (born January 28, 1975) is a Canadian former ice sledge hockey player. He won a gold medal with Team Canada at the 2006 Winter Paralympics.

References

External links 
 

1975 births
Living people
Canadian sledge hockey players
Paralympic sledge hockey players of Canada
Paralympic gold medalists for Canada
Ice sledge hockey players at the 2006 Winter Paralympics
Medalists at the 2006 Winter Paralympics
Sportspeople from Kitchener, Ontario
Paralympic medalists in sledge hockey